The 2008–09 Football Conference season was the fifth season with the Conference consisting of three divisions, and the thirtieth season overall. The Conference covers the top two levels of Non-League football in England. The Conference Premier is the fifth highest level of the overall pyramid, whilst the Conference North and Conference South exist at the sixth level.  The top team and the winner of the playoff of the National division were promoted to Football League Two, while the bottom four were relegated to the North or South divisions. The champions of the North and South divisions were promoted to the National division, alongside the play-off winners from each division. The bottom three in each of the North and South divisions were relegated to the premier divisions of the Northern Premier League, Isthmian League or Southern League. For sponsorship reasons, the Conference Premier is frequently referred to as the Blue Square Premier.

Conference Premier
A total of 24 teams contested the division, including 18 sides from last season, two relegated from the Football League Two, two promoted from the Conference North and two promoted from the Conference South.

Promotion and relegation
Teams promoted from 2007–08 Conference North
Kettering Town
Barrow

Teams promoted from 2007–08 Conference South
Lewes
Eastbourne Borough

Teams relegated from 2007–08 League Two
Mansfield Town
Wrexham

Eastbourne, Mansfield, Lewes and Wrexham appear in the Conference Premier for the first time, whilst Barrow return to the league after ten years. Kettering have three times been runners-up at this level and return to the league after an absence of five years. Altrincham remain in the Conference after a third consecutive reprieve from relegation, following Halifax Town's demotion for financial reasons.

Woking's relegation ended the tenure of the Football Conference's longest serving club, completing seventeen seasons in the top-flight.

League table

Results

Play-offs

Top goalscorers

Conference North

A total of 22 teams contested the division, including 16 sides from last season, three relegated from the Conference Premier, two promoted from the Northern Premier League and one promoted from the Southern Football League.

Promotion and relegation
Teams promoted from 2007–08 Northern Premier League Premier Division
 Gateshead
 Fleetwood Town

Teams promoted from 2007–08 Southern League Premier Division
 King's Lynn

Teams relegated from 2007–08 Conference Premier
 Droylsden
 Stafford Rangers
 Farsley Celtic

Droylsden and Farsley are returned having spent just one season in the higher league. Fleetwood reached a new high eleven seasons after being re-formed following the bankruptcy of the original Fleetwood Town. Both Boston United and Nuneaton Borough were expelled from the league for financial reasons before the season, resulting in Vauxhall Motors relegation and Redditch United's transfer to the Conference South being cancelled.

League table

Results

Play-offs

Top goalscorers

Conference South

A total of 22 teams contested the division, including 18 sides from last season, one transferred from the Conference North, two promoted from the Isthmian League and one promoted from the Southern Football League.

Promotion and relegation
Teams promoted from 2007–08 Southern League Premier Division
 Team Bath

Teams promoted from 2007–08 Isthmian League Premier Division
 Chelmsford City
 AFC Wimbledon

'''Teams transferred from 2007–08 Conference North
 Worcester City

No teams were relegated to the Conference South from the Conference Premier, so Worcester City were transferred in from the Conference North. The expulsion of two teams from the Conference North for financial reasons cancelled Redditch United's transfer between the two, and allowed Dorchester Town to remain in the Conference South. All the four new teams never played in Conference South before.

League table

Results

Play-offs

Top goalscorers

References

 
2008-09
5
Eng